Flos diardi, the bifid plushblue, is a species of lycaenid or blue butterfly found in Asia. The species was first described by William Chapman Hewitson in 1862.

References

Flos
Butterflies of Asia
Butterflies of Singapore
Butterflies of Indonesia